A broadcast clock or format clock is a template that displays a radio or television's hourly format in a graphical representation of a clock. Broadcast programming, especially radio, often follows an hourly pattern where certain segments such as news and commercials are repeated every hour at specific times. A broadcast clock displays these segments graphically which assist broadcasters in scheduling, thereby avoiding dead air and preventing random program selections by on-air staff.

References

Broadcasting